Kharia Thar is an Indic language spoken by the Hill Kharia culture of India.

References

External links
Kharia.in

Eastern Indo-Aryan languages
Languages of India